The Nevins Memorial Library at 305 Broadway in Methuen, Massachusetts was built in 1883 to honor David Nevins, Sr. as a memorial gift from his wife Eliza Nevins (née  Eliza Coffin), his elder son David Nevins, Jr., and his younger son Henry Coffin Nevins. The library is located at 305 Broadway in Methuen and was listed on the National Register of Historic Places in 1984.

The Nevins Memorial Library offers resources including free Wi-Fi internet access, book clubs, an outreach program to deliver books and media for homebound individuals, and so on.  The library is also the custodian of the Nevins Memorial Library Historic Collection, much of which is in storage and for which viewing appointments should be made.  The collection includes manuscripts and printed materials, genealogical resources, vital records, assorted objet d'art and collectables, and the stained glass windows of the library itself.

Gallery

See also
 National Register of Historic Places listings in Methuen, Massachusetts
 National Register of Historic Places listings in Essex County, Massachusetts

References

Further reading
 Harriet Howe Ames. Catalogue of the Nevins Memorial Library, Methuen, Massachusetts. Boston: Franklin Press, 1887

External links

Nevins Memorial Library Website

Library buildings completed in 1883
Libraries on the National Register of Historic Places in Massachusetts
Buildings and structures in Methuen, Massachusetts
Libraries in Essex County, Massachusetts
National Register of Historic Places in Methuen, Massachusetts